Hanson is an Anglicized English surname of Scandinavian and German origin, created from the two words Hans and son (son of Hans). Spoken in English by a German or Swedish immigrant to America, for example, the sound of Hans' son comes out sounding like Hansson, shortened to Hanson. In this same example, an immigrant from Norway would have a different accent, resulting in the sound of Hans' sen, or Hanssen, shortened to Hansen.

People with the name include:

A
 Alexander Hanson (actor) (born 1961), Norwegian-born British actor
 Alexander Contee Hanson (1786–1819), American lawyer
 A. M. Hanson (born 1969), English artist and photographer
 Alf Hanson (1912–1993), British football player
 Aline Hanson (1949–2017), Saint Martin educator and politician
 Ann Meekitjuk Hanson (born 1946), Canadian politician, commissioner of Nunavut
 Ann-Louise Hanson (born 1944), Swedish singer
 Arin Hanson (born 1987), American animator, voice actor, Internet personality

B
 Beverly Hanson (1925–2014), American golfer
 Bill Hanson (basketball) (born c. 1940), professional basketball player
 Brooke Hanson (born 1978), Australian swimmer and Olympic gold medal winner
 Brooke Hanson (born 1981), current coach and former professional volleyball player

C
 Sir Charles Hanson, 1st Baronet (1846–1922), British MP and Lord Mayor of London
 Sir Charles Hanson, 2nd Baronet (1874–1958), British politician
 Charlie Hanson, British producer and director
 Chris Hanson (born 1976), American football player
 Chris Hanson (born 1985), English golfer
 Christian Hanson (footballer) (born 1981), British football player
 Christian Hanson (ice hockey) (born 1986), American ice hockey player
 Curt Hanson (1943–2017), American politician
 Curtis Hanson (1945–2016), American film director

D 
 David Hanson (disambiguation)
 Duane Hanson (1925–1996), American sculptor

E
 Edward Hanson (1889–1959), United States Navy Rear admiral
 Einar Hanson (1899–1927), Swedish film actor
 Erik Hanson (baseball) (born 1965), American baseball player

F
 Frederick Hanson (late 20th century), Australian Commissioner of the New South Wales Police 1972–1976
 Fritz Hanson (1914–1996), American-born Canadian football player

G
 Gillian Hanson (1934–1996), British physician
 Glen Hanson, Canadian cartoonist and illustrator
 Greg Hanson (born 1967), American Operations Manager

H
 Hamza Yusuf Hanson (born 1958), American Muslim scholar and director of the Zaytuna Institute, California
 Harold Hanson (disambiguation)
 Hart Hanson (born 1957), American creator of TV series Bones
 Hector A. Hanson (1904-1993), American farmer and politician
 Helen Hanson (1874–1926), British physician, missionary and suffragist
 Herman W. Hanson (1859–1938), American politician
 Howard Hanson (1896–1981), American composer, conductor and educator

I
 Isaac Hanson (born 1980), American pop/rock musician

J
 Jake Hanson (born 1997), American football player

 Jane Hanson (born 1955), American television host
 Janine Hanson (born December 14, 1982), a Canadian rower from Winnipeg
 Jason Hanson (born 1970), American professional football player
 Jeff Hanson (1978–2009), American singer-songwriter
 Jeffrey O. Hanson (1958–2006), American politician
 Jennifer Hanson (born 1974), American country singer
 Jimmy Hanson (1904–?), English football player
 Jo Hanson (1918–2007), American environmental artist and activist
 Joel Hanson (contemporary), American singer and guitarist
 John Hanson (disambiguation), several people

K
 Kristine Hanson (born 1951), American Playboy Playmate and television weather person
 Kristy Hanson (born 1981), American singer-songwriter

L
 Lars Hanson (1886–1965), Swedish stage and film actor
 Linda N. Hanson, President of Hamline University
 Lyle Hanson (1935–2020), American politician

M
 Marcy Hanson (born 1952), American Playboy Playmate and actress
 Margus Hanson (born 1958), Estonian politician
 Mark Hanson (born 1946), Presiding Bishop of the Evangelical Lutheran Church in America
 Marla Hanson (born 1962), American screenwriter and ex-model
 Martin Hanson (born 1971), Swedish football referee
 Marv Hanson (1943–2004), American politician 
 Matt Hanson (born 1971), American author, film producer and film director
 Mitchell Hanson (born 1988), English football defender

N
 Norwood Russell Hanson (1925–1967), American philosopher

O
 Ole Hanson (1874–1940), American real estate developer and politician

P
 Paul D. Hanson (born 1939), American biblical scholar 
 Pauline Hanson (born 1954), Australian politician and television personality
 Per Albin Hansson (1885–1946), Prime Minister of Sweden
 Peter Hanson (born 1971), Swedish golfer
 Peter Hansson, Swedish heavy metal guitarist
 Petter Hansson (born 1976), Swedish footballer
 Pontus Hanson (1894–1962), Swedish breaststroke swimmer and water polo player

R
Ray Hanson (died 1982), American college football coach

Sir Reginald Hanson (1840–1905), Lord Mayor of London, Member of Parliament

Robert Hanson (disambiguation), several people
Robert M. Hanson (1920–1944), American Marine Corps aviator
Robin Hanson (born 1959), American professor of economics
Roger Hanson "Old Flintlock" (1827–1863), general in the American confederate army
Roger L. Hanson (1925–2005), American politician
Robert F. Hanson (1933–2002), Wrestler known as Swede Hanson
Rudolph Hanson (1903–2002), American lawyer and politician

S
 Sam Hanson (born 1939), Associate Justice of the Minnesota Supreme Court
 Sharon Hanson (born 1965), American heptathlete
 Stephen Hanson (1931–1997), South African cricketer
 Sven Hansson (1912–1971), Swedish cross country skier
 Sven Ove Hansson (born 1951), Swedish academic, philosopher, author and skeptic

T
Taya Hanson (born 2000), Canadian basketball player
 Taylor Hanson (born 1983), American pop/rock musician
Todd Hanson (born 1968), American writer and voice actor

 Travis Hanson, American rally car driver
Tony Hanson, Jamaican Basketball Player and Coach

W
 Walter R. Hanson (1931–2014), American politician

V
 Vic Hanson (1903–1982), American football and basketball player
 Victor Davis Hanson (born 1953), American military historian and political essayist
 Vince Hanson (1923–2009), American basketball player

Z
 Zachary Hanson (born 1985), American pop/rock musician

Fictional people
Tori Hanson, Wind Rangers character in the Power Rangers universe
Zoey Hanson, main character in the English dub of Tokyo Mew Mew, Mew Mew Power

See also
 Anson (name), given name and surname
 Hansen (surname) (including Hanssen)
 Hansson (surname)
 Henson (name), given name and surname

References

English-language surnames
Patronymic surnames
Lists of people by surname
Surnames from given names